Geoffrey Mac (born March 24, 1977) is an American fashion designer.

Life and career

Mac attended the School of the Art Institute of Chicago, where he earned his BFA in 1999. It was in Chicago where the Geoffrey Mac brand was officially launched in 2002, selling to top retailers that included Marshall Field's flagship store, who recognized Mac with the "Distinction in Design Award". It was, however, the Patricia Field boutique in New York City that was first to place an order for his latex designs. His designs are featured in the book Generation Fetish (2001) by Lee Higgs and major publications.

In 2003, the Fashion Group International selected Mac for the "Style Makers & Rule Breakers Award for Apparel". In 2004, he was further recognized in the Chicago Tribune as the "Young Designer of the Year". One of his designs was acquired for the permanent collection of the Chicago Historical Museum.

Mac moved to New York City in 2004, where he worked briefly with the prominent designer Cynthia Rowley. It was not long before he established himself independently and developed a following for his show-stopping custom designs with celebrity clients such as Deee-Lite, and Lil' Kim. His work began to make its way on to world concert stages by consulting, pattern making and constructing for Zaldy Goco, an influential fashion designer, for high-profile clients such as Lady Gaga for her Monster Ball Tour, Scissor Sisters, and Britney Spears for her 2011 Femme Fatale Tour.

Mac was the subject of America's Next Top Model, Cycle 16 - Episode 4, the legendary "fire challenge". For this challenge, the contestants modeled his designs during a runway presentation which featured explosive pyrotechnics lining the catwalk. The episode aired on Wednesday, March 16, 2011 and also featured guest judge photographer/director Francesco Carrozzini.

Mac made his official NYFW Runway debut on February 12, 2012 at the famous Exit Art venue. The show featured wigs by long-time Patricia Field stylist Codie Leone, a prominent New York-based transgender stylist and advocate. In recent years, Mac has developed an impressive portfolio for his custom designs working with a diverse range of clients such as Debbie Harry, Icona Pop, Neon Hitch, and RuPaul's Drag Race winner Sharon Needles. In March 2015, Mac was commissioned by Björk, to create a series of custom latex and silk dresses for her Vulnicura NYC residency.

In 2015, he worked with renowned stylist Arianne Phillips and Live Nation Entertainment to create custom garments for Madonna's Rebel Heart Tour. This included a series of latex bras worn by dancers in the "Holy Water"/Vogue section of the show. His sketch for this project was featured in WWD in September 2015. 
Later he also collaborated with hip hop rapper Cazwell on a range of form-fitting underwear, based on the colours used in the rapper's 'Ice Cream Truck' video. He also he had previously worked with Sharon Needles on a range of T-shirts and shorts and leggings.

Mac is featured as a contestant on season 18 of Project Runway. Having worked under a tight deadline throughout his career, the challenge of a televised contest show was not intimidating for him. Mac has always had a loyal cult following of celebrities and fashionistas.  Project Runway has brought his original designs to a wider audience and introduced him to a whole new world. At first, Mac resisted contest shows but he now knows it was a great opportunity to grow his business and take his brand to the next level.

References

Sources
 
 
 
 
 
 
 

1977 births
American designers
Living people
Place of birth missing (living people)